Rincón, M'Diq or Mediek, in , meaning [the] Strait) is a Mediterranean town in northern Morocco located between Fnideq and Tétouan. It borders Mellaliyine in the south and Allyene in the west. It is the seat of M'diq-Fnideq Prefecture.

It recorded a population of 56,227 in the 2014 Moroccan census and hosts more than 100,000 tourists each year. 

SNIM (M'Diq's Sailing Week/Semaine nautique internationale de M'Diq) is one of the most important tourist attractions. It is organised once a year by the M'Diq Royal Yachting Club and sponsored by several commercial firms. It is also significant to all the surrounding socio-cultural activities.

M'Diq's harbour 
The town's harbour is split into two parts: one for tourism and the other for fishing. Both have been expanded recently in order to improve tourist offerings and to increase the harbour's capacity. M'Diq is a popular weekend destination for residents of nearby Ceuta. Boats up to 50 metres long with a depth of nearly five metres can be moored.

References

External links 

 Nador Rif News www.ariffino.net
 Non-official website

Populated places in M'diq-Fnideq Prefecture
Mediterranean port cities and towns in Morocco
Prefecturial capitals in Morocco